Dodol is a sweet toffee-like sugar palm-based confection commonly found in Southeast Asia and the Indian subcontinent. Originating from the culinary traditions of Indonesia, it is also popular in Malaysia, Singapore, Brunei, the Philippines, Tamilnadu, Sri Lanka, Thailand, and Burma, where it is called mont kalama. It is made from coconut milk, jaggery, and rice flour, and is sticky, thick, and sweet.

History
It's mentioned in Gemekan inscription dated from the year 852 Saka or 930 CE originated from the Medang Kingdom period, right side line 23-24: "nañjapan, kurawu, kurima, asam, dwadwal, kapwa madulur malariḥ" (and snacks, such as kurawu, kurima, tamarind, dodol, all are illuminated and approach).

The history of dodol production is closely related to one of its main ingredients, gula aren or palm sugar, a traditional sugar made from the sap of Arenga pinnata plant, and also rice flour. It is a popular sweet treat and one of the oldest indigenous sweets developed in the Maritime Southeast Asia. The exact origin of dodol is unclear; while there is a remarkable diversity in preparations of the product within the island communities of Java and Sumatra, the variants tend to be adaptations of post-colonial crops. "Dodol" is a word of Sundanese origin, whereas in Javanese it is called jenang.

Dodol is believed to have been introduced to Southern India and Sri Lanka by migrants from Indonesia. It has also been attributed to the Portuguese, who occupied parts of the country during the 16th and 17th centuries. Several dodol recipes have been developed in Sri Lanka, such as kalu dodol. Dodol is very famous recipe in Kilakarai, Tamil Nadu. It was possibly believed to introduce by Sri Lankan Muslim immigrants. Dodol is a traditional Christmas dessert in Goa.

Cultural significance
In Muslim majority countries, such as Indonesia and Malaysia, dodol is commonly served during festivals, such as Eid ul-Fitr and Eid al-Adha as sweet treats for children. The Betawi people take pride in making homemade dodol during the Lebaran (Eid ul-Fitr), where family members will gather together to make dodol. Traditional home made dodol Betawi production center is located in Pasar Minggu area, South Jakarta.

Dodol is also popular among the Roman Catholics from the Indian west coast, also known as the former Estado da Índia Portuguesa, which includes East Indians from Mumbai, the state of Goa, and the city of Mangalore. Dodol Hj Ideris manufactures dodol and the company has now entered the Middle Eastern market, including Iran. Catholic devotees from Paoay, Ilocos Norte, Philippines celebrates the Guling-Guling Festival a religious festival which “dudol” is one of the main delicacy. Is a traditional festival, started during Spanish era by Spanish priest at the beginning of the 16th century. It is celebrated at the UNESCO world heritage site Paoay Church or San Agustin Church, the Tuesday before the Ash Wednesday—the last day for merrymaking before the start of the Lenten season. Locals dress and furnish their homes in a local way. Street festivities, cultural performances, pageants, and a food fair featuring Ilocano cuisine are all available to tourists. The celebration starts with a ritual called “Guling.” This word can be translated as “mark” or “sign.” In the old days, the mayor of the town smeared people’s foreheads with a white cross made of wet rice flour.

A related dessert in the Philippines is known as kalamay (literally "sugar"), which is made from sugarcane sugar instead of palm sugar. It also has a liquid consistency unlike dodol, since it uses ground glutinous rice rather than rice flour. However, the basic ingredients and preparation is similar.  

In Ilocos Region, Dudol makes for the perfect symbol of the Ilocano food heritage, It signifying solidarity, sticking together and will help enhance and deepen family ties if you eat dudol. Although it is also popular in Malaysia, Indonesia, and Southern India, dudol is a classic delicacy found in the Philippines' Ilocos Region. Before the arrival of the Spaniards, it is supposed to have passed through the Malay and Indian settlements on the coastal towns of the Ilocos region. Ilocano dudol is consisting of “diket” rice flour, coconut milk, and “benńal” sugarcane juice. 

In Mindanao and the Sulu Archipelago of the southern Philippines, dodol or dudul is more similar to the Indonesian and Malaysian variants and is known by the same name. It is usually prepared into thick cylinders wrapped in corn husks or coloured cellophane that is then cut into disks before serving. Although, like the kalamay, Filipino dodol is made with ground glutinous rice paste and muscovado sugarcane sugar, not palm sugar.

Preparation

Dodol is made from coconut milk, jaggery, and rice flour, and is sticky, thick, and sweet. The cooking process would reduce the contents up to half as the liquid evaporates. It normally takes 2 to 9 hours to cook, depending on the technique and tools used. During the entire cooking process, the dodol must be constantly stirred in a big wok. Pausing in between would cause it to burn, spoiling the taste and aroma. The dodol is completely cooked when it is firm, and does not stick to one's fingers when touching it.

Variants

Indonesia
There is a diverse variety of dodol recipes found in Indonesia. The town of Garut in West Java is the main production center of dodol in Indonesia. Many flavours of dodol are available, including a durian flavor called lempuk, which is popular in Medan and other Sumatran cities. A major producer of Garut-style dodol incorporates chocolate as an ingredient into a specialized variant product, with the intention of producing edible souvenirs from the city called 'chocodot' or chocolate dodol.

Other variants include:

 Dodol bengkoang contains jicama.
 Dodol kacang hijau contains mung beans.
 Dodol tape contains tapai, a fermented rice product
 Dodol ubi talam contains yam.
 Dodol sirsak contains soursop.
 Dodol nangka contains jackfruit.
 Dodol lidah buaya contains aloe vera.
 Dodol apel Malang contains apple, and is a speciality of Malang city, East Java.
 Dodol susu is from Pangalengan, Bandung, West Java. It contains milk.
 Dodol tomat contains tomato.
 Dodol salak contains salak.
 Dodol rumput laut contains seaweed. 
 Dodol pisang contains banana.
 Dodol nenas contains pineapple.
 Dodol mangga contains mango. 
 Dodol China is an Indonesian Chinese version of sweet nian gao with rich coconut sugar.
 Dodol Betawi is made by the Betawi people in Jakarta from a mixture of white and black glutinous rice.

In culture
In colloquial Indonesian, dodol can also be used as a slang term for the word 'bodoh' to refer a person as being 'stupid' or 'illogical'. It is impolite to refer a person as 'dodol'.

See also

 Mochi
 Caramel candy
 Butterscotch
 Kalamay
 Nian gao
 Nougat
 Kulolo

References

External links
 Dodol Indonesian sticky caramel toffee dessert a video from eastcodeTravel 
 Recipe

Indonesian snack foods
Sri Lankan desserts and sweets
Malaysian cuisine
Philippine desserts
Malay cuisine
Goan cuisine
Confectionery
Foods containing coconut
Burmese cuisine
Burmese desserts and snacks